= Lost Atlantis Experience =

Museum dedicated to Atlantis

Coordinates: 36°22′06″N 25°25′33″E

- Μουσείο Χαμένης Ατλαντίδας
- Established: 2019
- Location: Megalochori, Santorini, Greece
- Type: Interactive museum; mythology and local history
- Website: www.lost-atlantis.com

The Lost Atlantis Experience is a privately operated interactive museum in Megalochori, Santorini. Through digital and multimedia exhibits, the museum presents interpretations of the Atlantis myth in relation to the island's volcanic landscape.

== History ==
The museum opened in 2019 in Megalochori. A feature in the French edition of Forbes reported that the venue covers an area of about 700 square metres.

== Exhibitions and interpretation ==
The museum's exhibits include interactive installations and a multisensory show that introduces visitors to narratives about Atlantis and Santorini. Holographic projection and other interfaces are used. In 2025, the museum announced artificial intelligence-based features to expand accessibility and interactive storytelling.

== Media coverage ==
Greek media, including Athens Voice and LiFO, covered the museum's opening in June 2019. In September 2019, Protagon reported that a Discovery Channel crew carried out filming in Santorini on the subject of the Lost Atlantis. Ta Nea also covered Discovery Channel's interest in the museum.
